Alexandre Joel Chorin (born 25 June 1938) is an American mathematician known for his contributions to computational fluid mechanics, turbulence, and computational statistical mechanics.

Chorin's work involves developing methods for solving physics and fluid mechanics problems computationally. His early work introduced several widely used numerical methods for solving the Navier-Stokes equations, including the method of artificial compressibility, the projection method, and vortex methods. He has made numerous contributions to turbulence theory. In recent years he has been developing methods for prediction in the face of uncertainty  and for filtering and data assimilation.

Career 
Chorin is a University Professor at the University of California, a Professor of Mathematics at the University of California, Berkeley and a Senior Scientist at the Lawrence Berkeley National Laboratory.

Chorin received the Ing. Dipl. Physics degree from the EPFL (École Polytechnique Fédérale de Lausanne) in 1961, an M.S. in Mathematics from New York University in 1964, and a PhD in Mathematics from New York University in 1966.

Chorin is widely recognized for his mentoring of graduate students and postdoctoral fellows, many of whom have become nationally and internationally recognized scientists in their own right. In 2008 he was honored with the Sarlo mentoring award by the University of California, Berkeley.

Awards 
Chorin's awards include the National Academy Award in Applied Mathematics and Numerical Analysis (1989), the Norbert Wiener Prize of the American Mathematical Society and the Society for Industrial and Applied Mathematics (2000), the Lagrange Prize of the International Council on Industrial and Applied Mathematics (2011) and the National Medal of Science (2012). He is a member of the US National Academy of Sciences and a fellow of the American Academy of Arts and Sciences, the Society for Industrial and Applied Mathematics, and the American Mathematical Society.

Journal publications

Chorin, A. J. "A numerical method for solving incompressible viscous flow problems" J. Comput. Phys. 2 (1967), pp. 12-26.
Chorin, A. J. Numerical solution of the Navier-Stokes equations Math. Comp. 22 (1968) pp. 745-762 
Chorin, A. J., Numerical study of slightly viscous flow, J. Fluid. Mech. 57 (1973), pp. 785-796.
Chorin, A.J., Hald, O.H., and Kupferman, R., Optimal prediction and the Mori-Zwanzig representation of irreversible processes, Proc. Natl. Acad. Sci. USA 97 (2000), pp. 2968–2973.
Chorin, A.J. and Tu, X., Implicit sampling for particle filters, Proc. Natl. Acad. Sci. USA 106 (2009), pp. 17249–17254.

Books authored 

 Chorin, A. J., "Vorticity and Turbulence", Springer-Verlag (1994).
 Chorin, A.J. and O.H. Hald, "Stochastic Tools in Mathematics and Science", Springer-Verlag,  3rd ed., (2013).

References

External links

Living people
University of California, Berkeley College of Letters and Science faculty
Numerical analysts
Fluid dynamicists
Members of the United States National Academy of Sciences
Courant Institute of Mathematical Sciences alumni
New York University faculty
1938 births
Fellows of the Society for Industrial and Applied Mathematics
Fellows of the American Mathematical Society